Fleming: The Man Who Would Be Bond is a 2014 British miniseries of four instalments detailing the military career of James Bond creator Ian Fleming. The somewhat fictionalised biography spans the period from 1938 to 1952, dwelling on Fleming's romantic adventures as well as his espionage for the Royal Navy. Actor Dominic Cooper stars as Fleming, while Lara Pulver plays his love interest, Ann O'Neill.

Cast 
 Dominic Cooper as Ian Fleming
 Lara Pulver as Ann O'Neill
 Samuel West as Rear Admiral John Godfrey
 Anna Chancellor as Second Officer Monday 
 Rupert Evans as Peter Fleming 
 Lesley Manville as Evelyn Fleming
 Pip Torrens as Esmond Rothermere 
 Annabelle Wallis as Muriel Wright
 Camilla Rutherford as Loelia Lindsay
 Tim Woodward as Bomber Harris
 Stanley Townsend as William J. Donovan
 Michael Maloney as Edmund Rushbrooke
 Aurélien Recoing as François Darlan

Episodes

Series 1 (2014)

Release dates
The miniseries premiered on US television 29 January 2014, and on 12 February on UK television.

Awards and nominations

References

External links
 

BBC America original programming
Works about Ian Fleming
Television series set in the 1930s
Television series set in the 1940s